The 2017 Karjala Tournament was played between 8–12 November 2017. The Czech Republic, Finland, Sweden and Russia. The new teams involved in the tournament were Canada and Switzerland.

Finland won the tournament, ahead of Russia and Sweden.

Standings

Games
All times are local.
Helsinki – (Eastern European Time – UTC+2) Biel/Bienne – (Central European Time – UTC+1)

Best Players of the Tournament

References

Karjala Tournament
Karjala
Karjala
Karjala Tournament
Sports competitions in Örebro
2010s in Helsinki